Fathimath Nabaaha Abdul Razzaq (born 13 June 1999) is a Maldivian badminton player. She participated at the 2018 Asian Games in Jakarta, Indonesia. She clinched two title at the Pakistan International tournament, won the women's doubles partnered with her sister Aminath Nabeeha Abdul Razzaq and in the mixed doubles with Zayan Zaki. She represented Maldives at the 2020 Summer Olympics after receiving tripartite invitation.

Achievements

Indian Ocean Island Games 

Women's doubles

BWF International Challenge/Series (2 titles, 1 runner-up) 
Women's doubles

Mixed doubles

  BWF International Challenge tournament
  BWF International Series tournament
  BWF Future Series tournament

References

External links 
 

1999 births
Living people
Maldivian female badminton players
Badminton players at the 2018 Asian Games
Asian Games competitors for the Maldives
Badminton players at the 2020 Summer Olympics
Olympic badminton players of the Maldives
Commonwealth Games competitors for the Maldives
Badminton players at the 2022 Commonwealth Games